Michael T. "Mike" Peifer (born 1968) was a Republican member of the Pennsylvania House of Representatives, representing the 139th legislative district from 2006 to 2023.

Prior to elective office, Peifer attended Wallenpaupack Area High School. He attended Rider College on a baseball scholarship and earned a degree in accounting. Peifer worked for Price Waterhouse LLP, eventually rising to the level of a senior tax consultant as a Certified Public Accountant. In 1995, Peifer opened his own accounting and tax firm in his hometown of Greentown, Pennsylvania. Peifer served as Pike County treasurer from 1999 through 2006.

As a state representative, served on the board of the Pennsylvania Higher Education Assistance Agency from 2011 through 2022, including as the board's chair in 2017-2020 and 2022. Peifer also served as a deputy whip for the House Republican Caucus during the 2015-16 session.

Peifer did not seek reelection to the Pennsylvania State House in 2022. After leaving office, Peifer joined Novak Strategic Advisors as a Senior Advisor in February 2023.

References

External links
Pennsylvania House of Representatives - Michael Peifer official PA House website
Pennsylvania House Republican Caucus - Representative Michael Peifer official Party website

 http://www.reppeifer.com/bio.aspx

Living people
Republican Party members of the Pennsylvania House of Representatives
Rider University alumni
1968 births
People from Pike County, Pennsylvania
21st-century American politicians